A guard stone, jostle stone or chasse-roue (French lit. "wheel chaser"), is a projecting metal, concrete, or stone exterior architectural element located at the corner and/or foot of gates, portes-cochères, garage entries, and walls to prevent damage from vehicle tires and wheels.

Description 
Guard stones were developed as an item of street furniture during the era of horse-drawn vehicles, but some are still in use today. They are sometimes used as traffic bollards, but are generally positioned to protect a specific object, such as a corner of a building or the side of a gate. In Paris, they are usually metal in the shape of an arc, ball or cone. There are also models in hard stone with a sloping back to guide errant wheels away from impacting a building. Guard stones made of stone were sometimes surrounded by a metal ring to reduce wear.

The wheels, including the hub, of horse-drawn vehicles protrude beyond the vehicle's body, and are thus prone to collide with and damage a corner of a building or gate. Today, early guard stones are considered cultural heritage objects and some countries, such as France and Belgium, even protect them under specific heritage regulations.

In cities the older guard stones as a concept have been replaced by objects meant for automobile traffic, such as curbs and guard rails. As a city maintenance object they slowly became obsolete and were discarded or reused for other city purposes. When they were incorporated as part of a building's structure however, they were difficult to remove and many remain as silent witnesses to early traffic on historic roads. Today such objects are treasured for historic reasons and are often protected as part of a city's cultural heritage.

Applications

 Farmyard entry doors, subject to traffic by heavy horse-drawn carts.
 Wall corners at the intersection of two city streets (without pavements). In this case, they were often built into the wall.
 Guard stones made in Haussmann's renovation of Paris. 
 Turns in rural roads or along parapets of bridges.
 At turns or at intervals on a mountainous ascent. These also allowed helped the coachman to keep the vehicle from rolling backwards, while it paused to let the horses catch their breath.

Gallery

Notes

External links 
 
 Images of various models of guard stones
 Irish Examiner article related to jostle stone injury, January 2020

Architectural elements
Gates